Climate change increasingly affected health problems in Ethiopia such as mortality and morbidity due to floods and heat waves, vector-borne diseases, water-borne diseases, meningitis, and air pollution-related respiratory disease. It continued throughout several stages and has been the main problem in agriculture and health. Currently, research is undeveloped regarding the climate issues and lacks coordinated follow-up, while there are few subsistence research studies detailing metrological condition. In addition, there is little awareness and few trained professionals to cope with health-related problems caused by climate change.

Statistics 
Since the 1970s, Ethiopia has faced recurrent drought from different parts of regions. Between 1960 and 2006, the main annual temperature increased by 1.3°C. On average, the rate would be 0.28°C in temperature per decade. 

In the next few decade, human-induced climate change has changed in unprecedented level of global warming. Climate models suggested the elevation of further warming of 0.7°C and 2.3°C by 2020s and 1.4°C by 2050s. The current population, over 87 million people is expected to grow annually by 2.6% and will doubling by 2050, which signals the country exposure to impact of climate change, in both economic and social perspectives and devalue any developmental progress in the country.

Overall, poverty, rapid population growth, environmental degradation, chronic food insecurity, frequent natural drought cycles and rain-fed agriculture shown to exacerbate the vulnerability to climate change. Other include floods have resulted many deaths and property damage as well as displacement of people. Rapid population growth and improper traditional farming techniques put pressure on soil, water and biodiversity resources caused by neglect management such as extensive cultivation, overgrazing and deforestation.

Climate change also affects the gross domestic product (GDP) of the country by reducing between 0.5% and 2.5% each year. In this regard, Ethiopia has launched green economy to deal climate issues such as 2011 Climate Resilient Green Economy (CRGE) strategy. This strategy aimed to reduce greenhouse gas and fosters economic development and reducing carbon-based activities. 

From 1961 to 1990, the Ethiopian National Communication analysis identified high spatial and temporal variability; a more or less constant average annual precipitation at the national scale, but declining trends in northern parts while increasing trends in central part of Ethiopia. The study also showed an experiencing dry and wet years in temperature over last 50 years.

As regional models predict rainfall increase, high-quality analysis shows wavering of increase and decrease of overall rainfall averages. Rainfall variability also predicts possible frequency of flooding and drought affecting agriculture production. Proportional rainfall precipitation also increases specifically in July to September and October to December.

Extreme events

Extreme events like drought and floods, increased temperature and erratic rainfall are common in Ethiopia. Lowland regions are often exposed from frequency and magnitude of droughts. According to the 2010 World Bank report, Ethiopia is affected by frequent droughts since early 1980s, five of which caused famines in addition to dozens of local droughts. Significant droughts lead to drying of water resources and eventually water scarcity. Subsequent outcomes include poor hygiene and can lead to faeco-oral transmission of disease.

In 2015, about 15 million people starved due to El Niño-caused drought in Ethiopia. Major floods occurred in 1988, between 1993–1996, and in 2006 resulted significant deaths and property damages. In Gambela, climate change has caused a series of droughts, from tributary rivers such as Baro, Akobo, Gilo and Alwero and lower topography of the area. The 2008 flood in Gambela was caused by increased frequency and magnitude of flooding.

In Afar Region, climate risks are highly correlated with high child mortality rate. It has also the highest heatwave incidents and lack of medical facilities, and the lack of medical personnel could worsen the problem. A 2011 report indicated a prevalence of drought, erratic rainfall, animal diseases, water scarcity and human diseases have become major hazards in Chifra woreda. The region has also fallen into periodic land degradation; but a significant degradation of herd size per household, increase of infrastructure and emergence of settlements improved in recent times.

In Borena and Somali regions, severe temperatures, increase in barren land, dust and wind and water scarcity caused health problems. Most of resources in Shinile communities affected badly by climate hazards. Higher temperature in the area leads to rainfall intensity and water-borne diseases in Borena.

References

Environment of Ethiopia
Geography of Ethiopia
Ethiopia
Ethiopia